is a  tall tower located in the Momochihama area of Fukuoka, Japan. It is the tallest seaside tower in Japan. The highest observation deck at 123m has a 360degree view of the surrounding area, the most popular time to visit is at sunset. Fukuoka Tower was finished in 1989, taking a total of 14 months to build at a cost of ¥6,000,000,000 (roughly US$50,000,000 in 2015 terms). It was designed by Nikken Sekkei. It was built on reclaimed land out of Hakata Bay.

Architecture
Fukuoka Tower has a triangular cross-section which is covered with 8000 half-mirrors, giving it the appearance of a skyscraper. Because of this, it has been given the nickname "Mirror Sail". The half-mirrors reflect the sky when viewed from outside the structure but allow visitors to see outside while riding elevators to the top. The space between the base and the observation decks is hollow and thus unoccupied. There are three observation decks: one at 116 metres, a café/lounge deck at 120 metres, and the highest at 123 metres above the ground. Above this level rises a 111-metre television mast.

The underground weight of Fukuoka Tower is 25,000 tons. Its weight above ground, by contrast, is only 3,500 tons. The tower is designed to withstand magnitude 7 earthquakes and wind speeds up to 65 m/s. The strongest recorded earthquake in the area has been magnitude 6 and the strongest winds 49 m/s. The tower is located at 2-3-26 Momochihama, Sawara-ku, Fukuoka.

Culture
The tower appears in the Japanese film Godzilla vs. SpaceGodzilla (1994). In a battle between the titular monsters, SpaceGodzilla uses the tower to absorb energy before Godzilla destroys the tower after the foundation is weakened by the mech MOGUERA.

Gallery

See also
 List of tallest buildings in Japan

References

External links
  Fukuoka Tower HP
  Fukuoka Tower HP
  Kyushu.com Profile 

Buildings and structures in Fukuoka
Communication towers in Japan
Towers completed in 1989
Tourist attractions in Fukuoka
Observation towers in Japan
Restaurant towers
1989 establishments in Japan